Malkapuram is a village in Eluru district of the Indian state of Andhra Pradesh. It is located in Eluru mandal of Eluru revenue division. The town is a constituent of Eluru urban agglomeration.

Demographics 

 Census of India, Malkapuram had a population of 3461. The total population constitute, 1557 males and 1904 females with a sex ratio of 1223 females per 1000 males. 353 children are in the age group of 0–6 years with child sex ratio of 1089 girls per 1000 boys. The average literacy rate stands at 82.34 %

References

External links

Villages in Eluru district